Ruas is a surname. Notable people with the name include:

Arturo Ruas (born 1981), Lebanese-born Brazilian professional wrestler, Jiu-Jitsu practitioner, and former amateur wrestler
Charles Ruas,  American author, translator, literary and art critic, and interviewer
Hércules Brito Ruas (born 1939), Brazilian footballer known as Brito
Marco Ruas (born 1961), Brazilian mixed martial arts fighter, submission wrestler and instructor
Maria Aparecida Soares Ruas (born 1958), Brazilian mathematician and university professor
Simone Ruas (1919–2001), French Olympic high jumper